Liu Yang (born 29 October 1986) is a Chinese athlete specialising in the shot put. He won a silver medal at the 2018 Asian Games. In addition, he won a gold medal at the 2016 Asian Indoor Championships.

His personal bests in the event are 19.77 metres outdoors (Shenyang 2013) and 19.50 metres indoors (Nanjing 2013).

International competitions

References

1986 births
Living people
Chinese male shot putters
Athletes (track and field) at the 2018 Asian Games
Asian Games medalists in athletics (track and field)
Asian Games silver medalists for China
Medalists at the 2018 Asian Games
21st-century Chinese people